This is a list of Uvaria species, trees in the Annonaceae family, there are 168 accepted as of April 2021:

Uvaria acuminata 
Uvaria afzelii 
Uvaria alba 
Uvaria albertisii 
Uvaria ambongoensis 
Uvaria amplexicaulis 
Uvaria angolensis 
Uvaria annickiae 
Uvaria annonoides 
Uvaria antsiranensis 
Uvaria argentea 
Uvaria bathiei 
Uvaria baumannii 
Uvaria beccarii 
Uvaria bipindensis 
Uvaria blumei 
Uvaria boniana 
Uvaria borneensis 
Uvaria botryoides 
Uvaria brevistipitata 
Uvaria busgenii 
Uvaria cabindensis 
Uvaria cabrae 
Uvaria caffra 
Uvaria calamistrata 
Uvaria callicarpa 
Uvaria capuronii 
Uvaria caroli-afzelii 
Uvaria chamae 
Uvaria cinerascens 
Uvaria clavata 
Uvaria clementis 
Uvaria combretifolia 
Uvaria commersoniana 
Uvaria comperei 
Uvaria concava 
Uvaria cornuana 
Uvaria cuanzensis 
Uvaria cuneifolia 
Uvaria curtisii 
Uvaria curvistipitata 
Uvaria dac 
Uvaria dacremontii 
Uvaria dasoclema 
Uvaria dasychlamys 
Uvaria decaryana 
Uvaria decidua 
Uvaria denhardtiana 
Uvaria dependens 
Uvaria dinklagei 
Uvaria diplocampta 
Uvaria doeringii 
Uvaria dulcis 
Uvaria edulis 
Uvaria elliptifolia 
Uvaria excelsa 
Uvaria farquharii 
Uvaria faulknerae 
Uvaria ferruginea 
Uvaria flexuosa 
Uvaria forbesii 
Uvaria furfuracea 
Uvaria gabonensis 
Uvaria glabra 
Uvaria glabrata 
Uvaria goloensis 
Uvaria gracilipes 
Uvaria grandiflora 
Uvaria griffithii 
Uvaria hahnii 
Uvaria hamata 
Uvaria hamiltonii 
Uvaria heterotricha 
Uvaria hirsuta 
Uvaria hispidocostata 
Uvaria humbertii 
Uvaria johannis 
Uvaria kirkii 
Uvaria klaineana 
Uvaria klainei 
Uvaria kurzii 
Uvaria lamponga 
Uvaria lancifolia 
Uvaria lanuginosa 
Uvaria larep 
Uvaria lastoursvillensis 
Uvaria laurentii 
Uvaria leandrii 
Uvaria leichhardtii 
Uvaria lemurica 
Uvaria leopoldvillensis 
Uvaria leptocladon 
Uvaria leptopoda 
Uvaria littoralis 
Uvaria lobbiana 
Uvaria lombardii 
Uvaria lucida 
Uvaria lungonyana 
Uvaria macclurei 
Uvaria macgregorii 
Uvaria macrantha 
Uvaria macropoda 
Uvaria manjensis 
Uvaria marenteria 
Uvaria mendesii 
Uvaria micrantha 
Uvaria microcarpa 
Uvaria mocoli 
Uvaria modesta 
Uvaria mollis 
Uvaria monticola 
Uvaria muricata 
Uvaria musaria 
Uvaria narum 
Uvaria neoguineensis 
Uvaria ngounyensis 
Uvaria nicobarica 
Uvaria obanensis 
Uvaria oligocarpa 
Uvaria osmantha 
Uvaria ovata 
Uvaria paivana 
Uvaria panayensis 
Uvaria pandensis 
Uvaria papuasica 
Uvaria pauciovulata 
Uvaria pierrei 
Uvaria poggei 
Uvaria psorosperma 
Uvaria puguensis 
Uvaria pulchra 
Uvaria relambo 
Uvaria rivularis 
Uvaria rovumae 
Uvaria rufa 
Uvaria rupestris 
Uvaria saboureaui 
Uvaria sambiranensis 
Uvaria sankowskyi 
Uvaria sassandrensis 
Uvaria scabrida 
Uvaria scabridula 
Uvaria schefferi 
Uvaria scheffleri 
Uvaria schizocalyx 
Uvaria schweinfurthii 
Uvaria semecarpifolia 
Uvaria siamensis 
Uvaria smithii 
Uvaria sofa 
Uvaria sphenocarpa 
Uvaria tanzaniae 
Uvaria thomasii 
Uvaria timoriensis 
Uvaria tonkinensis 
Uvaria topazensis 
Uvaria tortilis 
Uvaria uhrii 
Uvaria unguiculata 
Uvaria utteridgei 
Uvaria valderramensis 
Uvaria verrucosa 
Uvaria versicolor 
Uvaria vietnamensis 
Uvaria welwitschii 
Uvaria wrayi 
Uvaria zeylanica 
Uvaria zschokkei

References

External links

List
Uvaria